Mark Walczak is a former NFL professional Football player who played tight end and long snapper for five NFL seasons for the Indianapolis Colts, Buffalo Bills, Phoenix Cardinals, and San Diego Chargers. Played in the Canadian Football League for the Memphis Mad Dogs in 1994-95 .

In 2007 Mark has been inducted into the New York State Section 5 High School Football Hall of Fame. Since being retired from the NFL, Walczak has shifted his focus to building a successful Real Estate company, Az Real Estate Advisors, llc in Scottsdale Arizona.

References

1962 births
American football tight ends
Indianapolis Colts players
Buffalo Bills players
Phoenix Cardinals players
San Diego Chargers players
Arizona Wildcats football players
Living people
Sportspeople from Rochester, New York
Players of American football from New York (state)